Benjamin Che Usher (born 3 February 1970) is a former English cricketer.  Usher was a right-handed batsman who bowls right-arm medium pace.  He was born at Wycliffe, County Durham.

One of Usher’s most infamous moments as a Barnard castle second team player was reverse sweep played with supreme flair

Usher's debut List A match came for a combined British Universities team against Worcestershire in the 1992 Benson and Hedges Cup.  He represented the team in 4 List A matches in 1992, the last of which came against Glamorgan.

Usher later made his debut for Northumberland in the 1996 Minor Counties Championship, playing 2 matches against Lincolnshire and Cambridgeshire.  He also represented the county in a single MCCA Knockout Trophy match against Lincolnshire in 1996.

His next appearance in List A cricket came when he represented the Durham Cricket Board against the Gloucestershire Cricket Board in the 1999 NatWest Trophy.  From 1999 to 2000, he represented the Board in 6 List A matches, the last of which came against Northamptonshire in the 2000 NatWest Trophy.  In his career total of 10 List A matches, he scored 76 runs at a batting average of 19.00, with a high score of 32.  In the field he took a single catch.  With the ball he took 6 wickets at a bowling average of 51.16, with best figures of 2/30.

Family
His grandfather, Charles Peat, played first-class cricket for Oxford University, Middlesex and the Free Foresters.  He was also later in his life a Conservative Member of Parliament for Darlington.

References

External links
Benjamin Usher at Cricinfo
Benjamin Usher at CricketArchive

1970 births
Living people
Cricketers from County Durham
English cricketers
Northumberland cricketers
Durham Cricket Board cricketers
British Universities cricketers